Jieyang is a prefecture-level city in eastern Guangdong Province (Yuedong), People's Republic of China, part of the Chaoshan region whose people speak Chaoshan Min distinct from neighbouring Yue speakers. It is historically important as the hometown of many overseas Chinese in Southeast Asia. It borders Shantou to the east, Chaozhou to the northeast, Meizhou to the north, Shanwei to the west, and looks out to the South China Sea to the south.

Administration
The prefecture-level city of Jieyang administers five county-level divisions, including two districts, one county-level city (administered on behalf of the province) and two counties.

These are further divided into 100 township-level divisions, including 69 towns, 10 townships and 21 subdistricts.

Economy
Rice cultivation and the textile industry are important to its economy.

Transport

Air
The new Jieyang Chaoshan International Airport is the third largest airport complex in Guangdong Province, after Guangzhou Baiyun International Airport, and Shenzhen Bao'an International Airport. It replaced the Shantou Waisha Airport on 15 November 2011.

Rail
Jieyang is located on the Guangzhou–Meizhou–Shantou Railway.

Language and culture
The Chaoshan Min is predominantly spoken in this region. The Hakka dialect, however, has its limited presence among Hakka people in Jiexi County.

History
The 1930s saw numerous Jieyang inhabitants emigrating overseas. A large number of Chinese live in Southeast Asia and kept their customs. Pontianak and Ketapang in Indonesia, Johor Bahru in Malaysia, Singapore, Cambodia and Thailand have large Overseas Chinese communities of Jieyang origin; the Lintian Republic, one of many kongsis of West Borneo, were founded by Jieyang immigrants. In 1991, the Chinese central government approved Jieyang as a prefecture-level city.

Notable people
 Vintoquián (Lîm tō-khiân) (?-?), 16th century pirate
Li Zhenning (born 1995), Chinese singer and actor
Ke Hua (19 December 1915 – 1 January 2019), former Chinese diplomat
Zeng Yi (8 March 1929 – 13 July 2020), virologist

Climate

References

External links

Government website of Jieyang (in Simplified Chinese)

 
Prefecture-level divisions of Guangdong